Darling, Arizona may refer to:
Winona, Arizona, whose railroad station has been renamed Darling
Darling Cinder Pit a mine located near Winona, Arizona